Pietro Iemmello (born 6 March 1992) is an Italian footballer who plays as a forward for  club Catanzaro.

Club career
Born in Catanzaro, Calabria, Iemmello was signed by Fiorentina at young age. He finished as the runner-up of the 2011 Torneo di Viareggio with the club, winning 2011 Coppa Italia Primavera. He also finished as the losing semi-finalists of the playoffs round of the youth league. He played in the finals and semi-finals as one of the starting forward in the 4–3–3 formation, except missed the second leg of the cup.

In July 2011 he was invited to pre-season camp of the first team, along with 11 other youth players. On 13 August he was loaned to Italian third division club Pro Vercelli along with Primavera (literally "Spring", the under-20 team) team-mate Marcos Miranda. On 29 June was renovate a loan for another season to Pro Vercelli. In Summer 2013 Pro Vercelli buy all player from Fiorentina.

Late in the 2013 summer transfer window, Pro Vercelli sold Iemmello to Spezia, who promptly loaned him to Novara.

In 2014 he moved to Foggia and scored 16 goals in 35 matches in the 2014–15 Lega Pro Gruppo C season. On 19 March 2016, Iemmello scored four goals in a single match for Foggia, including a 90th-minute winner in his team's 4–2 win over Ischia Isolaverde. He was one of the main men in the 2015–16 Lega Pro Gruppo C season, scoring an impressive 24 goals in 32 matches and being the league top scorer.

In August 2016 he was signed by Serie B side Spezia. He played just one Serie B match against Salernitana before moving to Serie A side Sassuolo. He scored 5 goals in 17 appearances in the 2016–17 Serie A season.

On 31 August 2017, Iemmello joined Benevento on a season-long loan deal with obligation to buy. He scored 2 goals in 14 appearances for the giallorossi, including a goal at San Siro against A.C. Milan which secured Benevento's first ever away win in Serie A, but the team could not avoid relegation.

In August 2018, Iemmello was loaned to Serie B side Foggia, making his return to the rossoneri side after two years. On 16 July 2019, he joined Serie B club Perugia on loan. Perugia held an obligation to purchase his rights in case of promotion to Serie A for the 2020–21 season. Perugia was relegated to Serie C, however.

On 4 October 2020, Iemmello moved abroad for the first time in his career after agreeing to a one-year loan deal at Spanish Segunda División side UD Las Palmas. Iemmello scored his first goal in Spanish football in the first round of the 2020–21 Copa del Rey against fourth-tier CD Varea on 17 December 2020.

On 31 January 2021 he signed with Frosinone on a permanent basis. On 20 January 2022, he moved to Catanzaro on loan. On 8 July 2022, Iemmello returned to Catanzaro on a permanent basis.

International career
Iemmello was a member of the Italy under-17 team at 2009 FIFA U-17 World Cup and took part in the 2011 UEFA European Under-19 Football Championship qualification campaign with U-19 team. He started his youth international career in a training camp for players born between 1992–93. He was not a regular of the U-17 team and did not play in the whole 2009 UEFA European Under-17 Football Championship. During the 2009–10 season he received call-up from the Italy U-18 team to prepare for the "World Junior Cup" and as a bridging team for U-19. He scored once in two friendlies against Czech Republic.

Iemmello travelled with the Azzurrini to Nigeria in October 2009, wearing no.18 shirt. Iemmello played all 5 matches in the U-17 World Cup for the de facto U-18 team as a starting forward, except the first one. He scored 2 goals, finishing as Italy's joint-topscorer along with Federico Carraro. He made his debut in the 74th minute of the first match, substituting Giacomo Beretta, who also started 4 matches, and partnered with Iemmello for 3 matches. After losing to Switzerland in the fifth match, the Azzurrini finished the tournament as the losing finalists. Iemmello also played for the Azzurrini U-18 team in the 2010 Slovakia youth cup, winning the tournament for the defending 2009 champions.

In the 2011 U-19 Euro qualifying campaign, he only played twice (out of 3 games) and only featured in the first game as a starting forward. In the elite round, he played all 3 matches but all as sub. Alberto Libertazzi and Giacomo Beretta were the starting forwards in the qualifying and elite rounds respectively. Iemmello did not score any goals in competitive games for the Italy U-19 team, however he scored two braces in the team's friendlies, with an average of 1 goal per friendly game.

Honours
Fiorentina youth
 Coppa Italia Primavera: 2011

Footnotes

References

External links
 
 
 FIGC 

1992 births
Living people
People from Catanzaro
Footballers from Calabria
Italian footballers
Association football forwards
Serie A players
Serie B players
Serie C players
F.C. Pro Vercelli 1892 players
Spezia Calcio players
Novara F.C. players
Calcio Foggia 1920 players
U.S. Sassuolo Calcio players
Benevento Calcio players
A.C. Perugia Calcio players
Frosinone Calcio players
U.S. Catanzaro 1929 players
Segunda División players
UD Las Palmas players
Italy youth international footballers
Italian expatriate footballers
Italian expatriate sportspeople in Spain
Expatriate footballers in Spain
Sportspeople from the Province of Catanzaro